Charles "Chippy" Simmons (9 September 1878 – 12 December 1937) was an English footballer who played as a centre-forward.

He played in the Football League for West Bromwich Albion and Chesterfield Town.

Biography
Simmons was born in West Bromwich and turned professional with West Bromwich Albion in April 1898. On 3 September 1900 Simmons became the first Albion player to score at The Hawthorns, when he equalised Derby County player Steve Bloomer's goal in a 1–1 draw. He moved to West Ham United for £700 in July 1904 and made 34 league apps scoring 8 goals (1 FA cup app, 0 goals), but returned to Albion for £600 just ten months later. He joined Chesterfield Town in March 1907 and went on to play for Wellington Town and Canadian side Royal Rovers. He died in Wednesbury in 1937. He became the top scorer in First Division 1901–02 by scoring 23 goals.

References
General

Specific

1878 births
1937 deaths
Sportspeople from West Bromwich
English footballers
Association football forwards
Oldbury Town F.C. players
Worcester City F.C. players
West Bromwich Albion F.C. players
West Ham United F.C. players
Chesterfield F.C. players
Telford United F.C. players
English Football League players
Footballers from the West Midlands (county)